Pristipagia is a genus of bivalves belonging to the subfamily Tellininae of the family Tellinidae.

Species
 Pristipagia adamsii (Bertin, 1878)
 Pristipagia bertini M. Huber, Langleit & Kreipl, 2015
 Pristipagia elaborata (G. B. Sowerby III, 1917)
 Pristipagia gemonia Iredale, 1936
 Pristipagia kolabana (Melvill, 1893)
 Pristipagia ojiensis (Tokunaga, 1906)
 Pristipagia radians (Deshayes, 1855)
 Pristipagia subtruncata (Hanley, 1844)

References

External links
 Raines B. & Huber M. (2012) Biodiversity quadrupled - Revision of Easter Island and Sala y Gomez bivalves. Zootaxa 3217: 1-106

Tellinidae
Bivalve genera